The Canaraua Fetei is a right tributary of the Danube in Romania. It passes through Lake Iortmac and Lake Oltina, and flows into the Danube near Oltina.

References

Rivers of Romania
Rivers of Constanța County